Senator Swan may refer to:

James D. Swan (1903–1977), Wisconsin State Senate
Monroe Swan (born 1937), Wisconsin State Senate

See also
Art Swann (born 1952), Tennessee State Senate
Senator Swain (disambiguation)